Gannavaram (Assembly constituency) is an SC reserved constituency in Konaseema district of Andhra Pradesh, representing the state legislative assembly in India. It is one of the seven assembly segments of Amalapuram Lok Sabha constituency, along with Ramachandrapuram, Mummidivaram, Amalapuram (SC), Razole, Kothapeta, and Mandapeta. Kondeti Chitti Babu is the present MLA of the constituency, who won the 2019 Andhra Pradesh Legislative Assembly election from YSR Congress Party. As of March 2019, there are a total of 189,258 electors in the constituency.

Mandals 

The four mandals that form the assembly constituency are:

The villages within the Mamidikuduru Mandal falling in this constituency are Pedapatnam, Appanapalle, Botlakurru Doddavaram, Pasarlapudi, Nagaram, Mogalikuduru, Makanapalem, Lutukurru, Pasarlapudilanka and Adurru. The other part of this mandal comes under Razole assembly constituency.

Members of the Legislative Assembly

Election results

Assembly Elections 2009

Assembly elections 2014

Assembly Elections 2019

See also 
 List of constituencies of the Andhra Pradesh Legislative Assembly

References 

Assembly constituencies of Andhra Pradesh